Cancellothyrididae is a family of brachiopods belonging to the order Terebratulida. It was first described by James Allan Thomson in 1926.

Genera 
Accepted genera by IRMNG:
 †Alithyris Sun, 1981
 †Bisulcina Titova, 1977
 Cancellothyris Thomson, 1926
Cooperithyris 
Cricosia 
Cruralina 
Gyrosoria 
Murravia 
Ortholina 
Praeterebratulina 
Rhynchonellopsis 
Sendaithyris 
Surugathyris 
Symphythyris 
Terebratulina 
Trochifera

References

Terebratulida